The Design 1041 ship (full name Emergency Fleet Corporation Design 1041) was a steel-hulled tanker ship design approved for production by the United States Shipping Boards Emergency Fleet Corporation (EFT) in World War I. A total of 13 ships were ordered and completed for the USSB from 1919 to 1920. The ships were constructed at the Oakland, California shipyard of Moore Shipbuilding Company. An additional 5 ships were completed separately by the shipyard.

References

Bibliography

External links
 EFC Design 1041: Illustrations

Standard ship types of the United States
Design 1041 ships